Yu-Gi-Oh! VRAINS is the sixth main anime series anime series in the Yu-Gi-Oh! franchise. It is produced by Gallop and broadcast by TV Tokyo. The series is directed by Masahiro Hosoda. The series follows Yusaku Fujiki. It takes place in a high school environment in Den City. The series features Charisma Duelists who use VR and are similar to YouTubers. The show's theme is "Let's take one step forward and try it!" This season uses five theme songs. From episodes 47–102, the first opening theme is "Go Forward" by Kimeru. From episodes 47–70, the first ending theme is "BOY" by uchuu. From episode 103, the opening theme is "Calling" (コーリング, Kōringu) by Kimeru.

The English dub of the season aired in Canada on Teletoon from September 2019 to January 2021.


Episode list

References

VRAINS (season 2)
2018 Japanese television seasons
2019 Japanese television seasons